The 8th Cavalry (Izz Ul Khail)  is an armoured regiment of the Pakistan Army. It was raised on 10 January 1991 in the Kingdom of Saudi Arabia in ARAR for the Operation Desert Storm. The Operation was based on the Liberation of Kuwait.

Battle honours
Operation Desert Storm 1991.

Decorations
Kuwait Liberation Medal
War Medal (Op Desert Storm)

See also
 8th Light Cavalry (India)

References

Armoured regiments of Pakistan
Military units and formations established in 1787